is a Japanese manga series by Kumiko Saiki. A sequel manga by Saiki has been serialized in Hakusensha's josei manga magazine Melody since 2015. It has been collected in twelve tankōbon volumes. The re-release and the sequel are licensed in North America by Seven Seas Entertainment. An anime television series adaptation produced by Pine Jam aired from July to September 2021.

Characters

She is a Kouka actress-aspirant at the Kouka School who stands out of the rest of the Centennial Class and the entire school, and not just because of her bubbly demeanor and being the tallest student in the school.

A former idol expelled from her group because of her trust issues with men, she applied at the Kouka School to escape her past and men in particular. She finds Sarasa, her classmate and dorm-mate, to be annoying at first.

Being a huge Kouka fan, she enrolls at the Kouka School, skipping her chance to become a prima ballerina.  She is the class representative of the Centennial Class.

She is the daughter of a second-generation Kouka actress and is in the same class as Sarasa and Ai.

Timid, shy, and plagued with problems concerning her weight, she almost quit the school due to the pressure; but, despite being underrated, she is one of the most talented performers in the Centennial Class.

She is one half of the Sawada Twins. Inspired by a bunny lady twins they saw on a Kouka performance, she auditioned for the Kouka school with her twin sister, but delayed her admission when her other twin did not make it, which became a flashpoint in their relationship with each other.

She is the more chipper half of the Sawada Twins. Inspired by a bunny lady twins they saw on a Kouka performance, she auditioned for the Kouka school with her twin sister, but because she did not make it on the first try at auditioning for the school, her sister had to delay her admission, which became a flashpoint in their relationship with each other.

The top star of the Kouka Winter Troupe, who is friends with Ai and Sarasa.

One of the second-year students, and is Ai's student-advisor.  She would sometimes bully Sarasa a bit, but she is, in her own way, dedicated to guiding Ai.

The second-year student who is Sarasa's student-advisor.  She would stand for her ward whenever Hijiri becomes a bit malicious with her.

She is sometimes seen with Hijiri and Risa, as she is in the Second Year, and serves as the class representative of the 99th Class.

He is known to Kouka school alumni and theater fans as "The Phantom" for his portrayal in The Phantom of the Opera. He is currently retired from acting after an accident during a performance, and is now an instructor at the Kouka School.

Ai's uncle and the only male she trusts. He is an instructor at the Kouka School.

He is a kabuki actor who is the heir-apparent to the name of the 15th-generation kabuki actor Suou Shirakawa. He is also Sarasa's boyfriend, although they act like simple childhood friends.

A kabuki actor and is Sarasa's father, but he is married to the daughter of Suou Shirakawa, making Sarasa his illegitimate daughter.

The School's drill sergeant.

Media

Manga
Kageki Shojo! is written and illustrated by Kumiko Saiki. It was serialized in Shueisha's Jump X magazine from May 10, 2012, until the magazine ceased its publication on October 10, 2014. Shueisha collected its chapters in two tankōbon volumes, released on May 10, 2013, and October 17, 2014. Hakusensha later re-released the series an omnibus volume, with the title Kageki Shojo!! Season Zero, on March 5, 2019. The re-release has been licensed in North America by Seven Seas Entertainment, who released it under the title Kageki Shojo!! The Curtain Rises.

A sequel series, titled Kageki Shojo!!, began serialization in Hakusensha's Melody magazine on February 28, 2015. The series has been collected in twelve tankōbon volumes. The sequel series has also been licensed by Seven Seas Entertainment in North America.

Volume list

Kageki Shojo!

Kageki Shojo!!

Anime
An anime television series adaptation, also titled Kageki Shojo!!, was announced in the December issue of Melody magazine on October 28, 2020. The series is animated by Pine Jam and directed by Kazuhiro Yoneda, with Tadashi Morishita handling series' composition, Takahiro Kishida designing the characters, and Tsuneyoshi Saito composing the series' music. It aired from July 4 to September 26, 2021 on AT-X and other channels. The opening theme song "Hoshi no Orchestra" (Starry Orchestra) is performed by three-member band saji, while the ending theme song "Hoshi no Tabibito" (Stellar Traveler) is performed by Sayaka Senbongi and Yumiri Hanamori. Funimation licensed the series.

Episode list

Reception
The School Library Journal listed the first volume of Kageki Shojo!! as one of the top 10 manga of 2021.

Notes

References

External links
  
 

2021 anime television series debuts
Anime series based on manga
AT-X (TV network) original programming
Funimation
Hakusensha manga
Pine Jam
Josei manga
Seinen manga
Seven Seas Entertainment titles
Shueisha manga
Theatre in anime and manga